Ebsen is a surname. Notable people with the surname include: 

 Buddy Ebsen (1908–2003), American actor and dancer 
 John Ebsen (born 1988), Danish cyclist 
 Kiki Ebsen (born 1958), American musician
 Vilma Ebsen (1910–2007), American actress and dancer, brother of Buddy

See also
Ibsen (name)